Alex Meret  (born 22 March 1997) is an Italian professional footballer who plays as a goalkeeper for  club Napoli and the Italy national team.

Born in Udine, Meret began his career at an early age with amateur club Donatello Calcio before making a switch to the famous Udinese youth system in 2012. After rising through the academy system at the club, he made his senior debut in 2015. He later had spells on loan with SPAL, whom he helped win the Serie B title in 2017, and achieve promotion to Serie A. He joined Napoli in 2018.

At international level, Meret has represented Italy at U16, U17, U18, U19 and U21 levels, and made his senior debut for Italy in 2019, also representing the nation at their victorious UEFA Euro 2020 campaign.

Club career

Udinese
An Udinese youth product, Meret was promoted to the first team as second-choice goalkeeper behind Orestis Karnezis during the 2015–16 season. He made his senior professional debut on 2 December 2015 in the Coppa Italia against Atalanta.

In July 2016, Meret was sent on loan to Serie B club SPAL. He returned to SPAL on loan for the 2017–18 season.

Napoli
On 5 July 2018, Meret signed with Napoli until 30 June 2023. The transfer fee agreed with Udinese was reported as €35 million. He made his European debut on 14 February 2019, in a 3–1 away win over FC Zürich in the first leg of the round of 32 of the Europa League.

He was initially often used in a rotational role along with David Ospina during his first two seasons with Napoli; however, under the club's new manager Gennaro Gattuso, he was relegated to the bench up until the season break due to the COVID-19 pandemic in March 2020, as the coach favoured the Colombian shot-stopper due to his superior ability with the ball at his feet. Due to a suspension to Ospina, however, Meret started in the 2020 Coppa Italia Final against Juventus on 17 June; following a goalless draw after regulation time, Meret saved Paulo Dybala's spot kick, helping his team earn a 4–2 penalty shoot-out victory. Subsequently, Meret ended up in the rotation with Ospina again, starting every second match on average until the end of the season. This rotational role was maintained in the following 2020–21 season, with Ospina and Meret taking turns every other match in the Europa League, Serie A and Coppa Italia.

International career
Meret was a crucial member in the Italy U19 national team which took part in the 2016 UEFA European Under-19 Championship, finishing as runner-up after losing in the final; he was named in the team of the tournament alongside Kylian Mbappé of France.

In March 2017, following impressive performances for SPAL in Serie B, he was called up to the Italy national team squad for the World Cup qualification for a match against Albania and a friendly against the Netherlands.

On 22 March 2018, he made his debut with the Italy U21, playing as starter in a friendly match against Norway.

He took part in the 2019 UEFA European Under-21 Championship under manager Luigi Di Biagio, as the team's first-choice goalkeeper.

Meret made his international debut for the senior national team under manager Roberto Mancini, on 18 November 2019, coming on as a substitute for Salvatore Sirigu in a 9–1 home win over Armenia, in Italy's final Euro 2020 qualifier.

In June 2021, he was included in Italy's squad for UEFA Euro 2020. On 11 July, Meret won the European Championship with Italy following a 3–2 penalty shoot-out victory over England at Wembley Stadium in the final, after a 1–1 draw in extra-time. He was the only squad member not to make an appearance in the competition.

Style of play
Considered once to be a talented and highly promising young goalkeeper in the Italian media, Meret is an agile goalkeeper, who possesses good reactions and shot-stopping abilities, despite his height and imposing physique, and who is known for his handling and ability to rush off his line. He has also drawn praise in the media for his decision–making, maturity, and calm composure under pressure, as well as his discipline and work ethic, despite his youth; moreover, he is capable of organising his defence effectively and is known for his penalty–stopping abilities. Although he is competent with his feet, his distribution has been cited as an area in need of improvement. He has also struggled with physical problems and injuries throughout his career.

Career statistics

Club

International

Honours
SPAL
Serie B: 2016–17

Napoli
Coppa Italia: 2019–20

Italy U19
UEFA Euro U-19 Championship runners-up: 2016

Italy
UEFA European Championship: 2020
UEFA Nations League third place: 2020–21

Individual
 Primavera Girone B Goalkeeper of the Year: 2014–15
 UEFA European Under-19 Championship team of the tournament: 2016
 Serie B Goalkeeper of the Year: 2016–17
 UEFA Champions League Breakthrough XI: 2019

Orders
 5th Class / Knight: Cavaliere Ordine al Merito della Repubblica Italiana: 2021

References

External links

Profile at the S.S.C. Napoli website

Lega Serie A Profile

FIGC Profile 

Living people
1997 births
Sportspeople from Udine
Association football goalkeepers
Italian footballers
Italy youth international footballers
Italy international footballers
Italy under-21 international footballers
Udinese Calcio players
S.P.A.L. players
S.S.C. Napoli players
Serie B players
Serie A players
UEFA Euro 2020 players
UEFA European Championship-winning players
Knights of the Order of Merit of the Italian Republic
Footballers from Friuli Venezia Giulia